Kubbra Sait is an Indian actress, TV host and model who has appeared in the films Sultan, Ready and City Of Life. She gained widespread recognition for her performance as Kukoo on the First Season of Netflix original show Sacred Games. She also portrayed the role of Phara Keaen in the Apple TV+ show Foundation.

Early life and career
Kubbra Sait was born in Bangalore to Zakariah Sait and Yasmin Sait. Her younger brother Danish Sait is a radio jockey and television host. Her uncle Tanveer Sait is a politician. Her grandfather Azeez Sait was a minister in Karnataka. In 2005, she moved to Dubai after her graduation from  National Institute of Information & Management Sciences, Bangalore. She started hosting shows when she was about thirteen years old. Sait started her career as an accounts manager with Microsoft in Dubai before pursuing her career in the entertainment industry. She is a winner of the India's Best female Emcee Award in 2013. She also won Miss Personality in Miss India Worldwide Beauty Pageant in 2009. Sait was praised for her role as a transgender woman named Kukoo in the Netflix show Sacred Games. The Netflix original was nominated under the Best Drama category at the 47th International Emmy Awards. Sait represented Sacred Games at the Emmy Awards, held on 25 November 2019.

Filmography

Films

Web series

References

External links

 
 

Year of birth missing (living people)
Living people
21st-century Indian actresses
Actresses from Bangalore
Female models from Bangalore
Actresses in Hindi cinema